The Aguada Limestone is a geologic formation in Puerto Rico. It preserves fossils dating back to the Neogene period.

See also

 List of fossiliferous stratigraphic units in Puerto Rico

References
 

Limestone formations
Neogene Puerto Rico
Geologic formations of Puerto Rico
Geologic formations of the Caribbean
Limestone formations of the United States